The Circus Clown is a 1934 American Pre-Code comedy film about a man who wants to join the circus against the wishes of his ex-circus clown father. It stars Joe E. Brown and Patricia Ellis.

Plot
Young Happy Howard (Joe E. Brown) has been secretly practising the skills of a circus clown like his father was. His father, however, has put the circus behind him and discourages him from joining the circus. When the circus comes to town, Happy runs away with it, taking menial jobs while hoping for a chance to perform. Happy becomes infatuated with Alice (Patricia Ellis), a young aerialist, helping her take care of her nephew.

Alice arranges for a place in her aerial act for her alcoholic brother Frank who is recovering from the loss of his wife. On the day of the aerial act's first performance, Happy catches the brother drinking As he tries to stop him from drinking, the sister comes into the room and Happy pretends it is his liquor and drinks it all. Happy is discovered drunk by the circus owner and is fired. He is rejected by the girl and returns home to his father.

He reads in the newspaper that Alice is now a big star. He returns to the circus to try and win her back and explain. Happy arrives to find the brother is drinking and they fight. Happy knocks him out and has to take his place in the show. Happy is a big success to the delight of his father in the audience and is forgiven by Alice.

Cast

 Joe E. Brown - Happy Howard and H. "Chuckles" Howard (the father)
 Patricia Ellis - Alice
 Dorothy Burgess - Babe
 Don Dillaway - Jack
 Gordon Westcott - Frank
 Charles C. Wilson - Sheldon (as Charles Wilson)
 Harry Woods - Ajax
 Ronnie Cosby - Dickie
 John Sheehan - Moxley
 Spencer Charters - Kingsley
 Tom Dugan - Mac (scenes deleted)
 Earle Hodgins - Circus Barker
 Gordon Evans - Undetermined Role
 Ward Bond - Unimpressed Man in Audience

Production
Although not credited, Joe E. Brown also plays the role of his father throughout the film.  Additionally, in two sequences employing the split screen technology process, Joe E. Brown appears as both his father, H. "Chuckles" Howard, and as Happy Howard.  The first sequence is when both characters are sitting side by side, fishing.  The second is when the two characters are sitting together at the circus. In both cases, the father character is on the left side of the screen.

References

External links
 
 
 
 

1934 films
1934 comedy films
American black-and-white films
American comedy films
Circus films
Comedy films about clowns
Films directed by Ray Enright
Warner Bros. films
1930s English-language films
1930s American films